Ashley Mehrotra (born 29 November 1969) is a Indian-born, New Zealand cricket umpire. He has stood in matches in the Plunket Shield.

References

External links
 

1969 births
Living people
New Zealand cricket umpires
People from Kanpur